The following were the events of association football for the year 2019 throughout the world.

Events

FIFA
23 May – 15 June: 2019 FIFA U-20 World Cup in 
 : 
 : 
 : 
 4th: 
7 June – 7 July: 2019 FIFA Women's World Cup in 
 : 
 : 
 : 
 4th: 
26 October – 17 November: 2019 FIFA U-17 World Cup in 
 : 
 : 
 : 
 4th:

AFC
 5 January – 1 February: 2019 AFC Asian Cup in the 
 : 
 :

CAF
21 June – 19 July: 2019 Africa Cup of Nations in 
 : 
 : 
 : 
 4th: 
8–22 November: 2019 Africa U-23 Cup of Nations in 
 : 
 : 
 : 
 4th:

CONCACAF
1–16 May: 2019 CONCACAF U-17 Championship in the 
 : 
 : 
 : 
 :

CONMEBOL
17 January – 10 February: 2019 South American U-20 Championship in  Chile
 : 
 : 
 : 
 4th: 
 21 March – 14 April: 2019 South American U-17 Championship in  Peru
 : 
 : 
 : 
 4th: 
14 June – 7 July: 2019 Copa América in  Brazil
 : 
 : 
 : 
 4th:

UEFA
3–19 May: 2019 UEFA European Under-17 Championship in  Republic of Ireland
 : 
 : 
 5–17 May: 2019 UEFA Women's Under-17 Championship in  Bulgaria
 : 
 : 
5–9 June: 2019 UEFA Nations League Finals in  Portugal
: 
: 
: 
4th: 
16–30 June: 2019 UEFA European Under-21 Championship in  Italy and  San Marino
 : 
 : 
14–27 July: 2019 UEFA European Under-19 Championship in  Armenia
 : 
 : 
16–28 July: 2019 UEFA Women's Under-19 Championship in  Scotland
 : 
 :

Non FIFA
1–9 June: 2019 CONIFA European Football Cup in  Artsakh
 : 
 : 
 : 
 4th:  Chameria
15–22 June: 2019 Inter Games Football Tournament in  Anglesey
Men's
: 
: 
: 
4th: 
Women's
: 
: 
: 
4th:

North and Central America
 28 February – 8 March: 2019 Windward Islands Tournament in  Kingstown
 : 
 : 
 : 
 4th: 
 30 June – 7 July: WIFA Women's Championships in 
 : 
 : 
 : 
 4th:

South America
25 July – 9 August: Football at the 2019 Pan American Games in Lima,  Peru
Men's
 : 
 : 
 : 
 4th: 
Women's
 : 
 : 
 : 
 4th:

Africa
 8–18 May: 2019 WAFU Zone B Women's Cup in 
 :  
 : 
 : 
 4th: 
 25 May – 8 June: 2019 COSAFA Cup in 
 : 
 : 
 : 
 4th: 
 18–27 July: Football at the 2019 Indian Ocean Islands Games in 
 : 
 : 
 : 
 4th: 
 31 July – 11 August: 2019 COSAFA Women's Championship in  Port Elizabeth
 : 
 : 
 : 
 4th: 
 1–11 August: 2019 COSAFA U-20 Women's Championship in 
 : 
 : 
 : 
 4th:

Asia
 7–15 January: 2019 WAFF Women's Championship in 
 : 
 : 
 : 
 4th: 
17–26 February: 2019 AFF U-22 Youth Championship in  Cambodia
 : 
 : 
 : 
 4th: 
12–22 March: 2019 SAFF Women's Championship in  Nepal
 : 
 : 
9–21 May: 2019 AFF U-16 Girls' Championship in  Chonburi
 : 
 : 
 : 
 4th: 
26 July – 1 August: 2019 CAFA Youth Championship in  Dushanbe & Gissar
 : 
 : 
 : 
 4th: 
27 July – 9 August: 2019 AFF U-16 Youth Championship in  Chonburi
 : 
 : 
 : 
 4th: 
2–14 August: 2019 WAFF Championship in 
 : 
 : 
6–19 August: 2019 AFF U-19 Youth Championship in   Ho Chi Minh City
 : 
 : 
 : 
 4th: 
9–15 August: 2019 CAFA Junior Championship in  Dushanbe
 : 
 : 
 : 
 4th: 
15–27 August: 2019 AFF Women's Championship in  Chonburi
 : 
 : 
 : 
 4th: 
 26 November – 8 December: 24th Arabian Gulf Cup in  Qatar
 : 
 : 
 9–18 December: 2019 EAFF E-1 Football Championship in  South Korea
 : 
 : 
 : 
 4th: 
 10–17 December: 2019 EAFF E-1 Football Championship (women) in  South Korea
 : 
 : 
 : 
 4th:

Men's championships and tournaments
 20–23 March: 2019 Airmarine Cup in  Kuala Lumpur
 : 
 : 
 : 
 4th: 
 20–26 March: 2019 International Friendship Championship in  Basra
 : 
 : 
 : 
 21–25 March: 2019 China Cup in  Nanning
: 
: 
: 
4th: 
25–29 May: 2019 Panda Cup in 
 : 
 : 
 : 
 4th: 
1–15 June: 2019 Toulon Tournament in 
 : 
 : 
 : 
 4th: 
 5–8 June: 2019 King's Cup in 
: 
: 
: 
4th: 
7–9 June: 2019 Merlion Cup in 
 : 
 : 
 : 
 4th: 
 7–18 July: 2019 Intercontinental Cup in  Ahmedabad
 : 
 : 
 : 
 4th: 
 28 July – 8 August: 2019 COTIF Tournament in  L'Alcúdia
 : 
 :

Women's championships and tournaments
 17–20 January: 2019 Four Nations Tournament in  Meizhou
 : 
 : 
 : 
 4th: 
 9–15 February: 2019 Women's Gold Cup in  Bhubaneswar
 : 
 : 
 : 
 4th: 
 27 February – 2 March: 2019 Aphrodite Women Cup in 
 : 
 : 
 : 
 4th: 
 26 February – 4 March: 2019 Istria Cup in 
 : 
 : 
 : 
 4th: 
 27 February – 5 March: 2019 Turkish Women's Cup in 
 :  B
 : 
 : 
 4th: 
 28 February – 6 March: 2019 Cup of Nations in 
 :  
 : 
 : 
 4th: 
 27 February – 6 March: 2019 Cyprus Women's Cup in 
 :  
 : 
 : 
 4th: 
 27 February – 6 March: 2019 Algarve Cup in 
 :  
 : 
 : 
 4th: 
 27 February – 5 March: 2019 SheBelieves Cup in the 
 :  
 : 
 : 
 4th: 
4–7 April: 2019 Wuhan International Tournament in  Wuhan
 :  
 : 
 : 
 4th: 
 25 April – 4 May: 2019 Bangamata U-19 Women's Gold Cup in  Dhaka
 :  and 
 8–18 May: 2019 Sud Ladies Cup in 
 : 
 : 
 : 
 4th:

Fixed dates for national team matches 

Scheduled international matches per their International Match Calendar. Also known as FIFA International Day/Date(s).
18–26 March
3–11 June
2–10 September
7–15 October
11–19 November

Club continental champions

Men

Women

Domestic leagues

UEFA

AFC

CAF

CONCACAF

CONMEBOL

OFC

Domestic cups

AFC

UEFA

CAF

CONCACAF

CONMEBOL

OFC

Women's leagues

UEFA

AFC

CONCACAF

CONMEBOL

OFC

Women's cups

UEFA

AFC

OFC

Detailed association football results

FIFA
 May 23 – June 15: 2019 FIFA U-20 World Cup in 
  defeated  3–1 to win their first FIFA U-20 World Cup title.
  took third place.
 June 7 – July 7: 2019 FIFA Women's World Cup in 
 The  defeated the  2–0 to win their second consecutive and fourth overall FIFA Women's World Cup title.
  took third place.
 October 26 – November 17: 2019 FIFA U-17 World Cup in 
  defeated  2–1 to win their fourth FIFA U-17 World Cup title.
  took third place.
 December 11 – 22: 2019 FIFA Club World Cup in 
  Liverpool defeated  Flamengo, 1–0 in extra time, to win their first FIFA Club World Cup title.
  Monterrey took third place.

UEFA
National teams
 May 3 – 19: 2019 UEFA European Under-17 Championship in 
 The  defeated , 4–2, to win their second consecutive and fourth overall UEFA European Under-17 Championship title.
 May 5 – 17: 2019 UEFA Women's Under-17 Championship in 
 June 5 – 9: 2019 UEFA Nations League Finals in 
  took third place.
 June 16 – 30: 2019 UEFA European Under-21 Championship in  & 
  defeated , 2–1, to win their fifth UEFA European Under-21 Championship title.
 Note: All teams mentioned above have qualified to compete at the 2020 Summer Olympics.
 July 14 – 27: 2019 UEFA European Under-19 Championship in 
  defeated , 2–0, to win their 11th UEFA European Under-19 Championship title.
 July 16 – 28: 2019 UEFA Women's Under-19 Championship in 
  defeated , 2–1, to win their fifth UEFA Women's Under-19 Championship title.

Clubs
 September 12, 2018 – May 18, 2019: 2018–19 UEFA Women's Champions League (final in  Budapest)
  Lyon defeated  Barcelona 4–1 to win their fourth consecutive and sixth overall UEFA Women's Champions League title.
 September 18, 2018 – April 29, 2019: 2018–19 UEFA Youth League (final in  Nyon)
  Porto defeated  Chelsea 3–1 to win their first UEFA Youth League title.
 September 18, 2018 – June 1, 2019: 2018–19 UEFA Champions League (final in  Madrid)
  Liverpool defeated fellow English team Tottenham Hotspur 2–0 to win their sixth UEFA Champions League title.
 Note: Liverpool would represent UEFA at the 2019 FIFA Club World Cup.
 September 20, 2018 – May 29, 2019: 2018–19 UEFA Europa League (final in  Baku)
  Chelsea defeated fellow London side Arsenal 4–1 to win their second UEFA Europa League title.
 August 14: 2019 UEFA Super Cup in  Istanbul
  Liverpool defeated fellow English team Chelsea 5–4 on penalties after extra time ended in a 2–2 draw, winning their fourth UEFA Super Cup title.

CONMEBOL
National teams
 January 17 – February 10: 2019 South American U-20 Championship in 
 Champions: ; Second: ; Third: ; Fourth: 
 Note 1: All four teams mentioned above have qualified to compete at the 2019 FIFA U-20 World Cup.
 March 21 – April 14: 2019 South American U-17 Championship in 
 Champions: ; Second: ; Third: ; Fourth: 
 Note: All four teams mentioned above have qualified to compete at the 2019 FIFA U-17 World Cup.
 June 14 – July 7: 2019 Copa América in 
  defeated , 3–1, to win their ninth Copa América title.
  took third place.
 November 23 – December 8: 2019 South American U-15 Championship in 
 Champions: ; Second: ; Third: ; Fourth: 

Clubs
 January 22 – November 23: 2019 Copa Libertadores (final in  Lima)
  Flamengo defeated  River Plate, 2–1, to win their second Copa Libertadores title.
 Note: Flamengo would represent CONMEBOL at the 2019 FIFA Club World Cup.
 February 5 – November 9: 2019 Copa Sudamericana (final in  Asunción)
  Independiente del Valle defeated  Colón, 3–1, to win their first Copa Sudamericana title.
 May 22 & 30: 2019 Recopa Sudamericana (Matches played in  Curitiba &  Buenos Aires) 
  River Plate defeated  Athletico Paranaense, 3–1, to win their third Recopa Sudamericana title.
 August 7: 2019 J.League Cup / Copa Sudamericana Championship in  Hiratsuka
  Club Athletico Paranaense defeated  Shonan Bellmare, 4–0, to win their first J.League Cup / Copa Sudamericana Championship title.
 October 11 – 28: 2019 Copa Libertadores Femenina in  Quito
  Corinthians defeated fellow Brazilian team, Ferroviária, 2–0, to win their first Copa Libertadores Femenina title.
  América took third place.

AFC
National teams
 January 5 – February 1: 2019 AFC Asian Cup in the 
  defeated , 3–1, to win their first AFC Asian Cup title.
 September 15 – 28: 2019 AFC U-16 Women's Championship in 
  defeated , 2–1, to win their fourth AFC U-16 Women's Championship title.
  took third place.
 Note: Both Japan and North Korea have qualified to compete at the 2020 FIFA U-17 Women's World Cup.
 October 27 – November 9: 2019 AFC U-19 Women's Championship in 
  defeated , 2–1, to win their third consecutive and sixth overall AFC U-19 Women's Championship title.
  took third place.
 Note: All three teams mentioned above have qualified to compete at the 2020 FIFA U-20 Women's World Cup.

Clubs
 February 5 – November 4: 2019 AFC Cup
  Al Ahed FC defeated  April 25, 1–0, to win their first AFC Cup title.
 February 5 – November 24: 2019 AFC Champions League
  Al-Hilal defeated  Urawa Red Diamonds, 3–0 on aggregate, to win their third AFC Champions League title.
 Note: Al-Hilal would represent the AFC at the 2019 FIFA Club World Cup.

AFF
 February 17 – 26: 2019 AFF U-22 Youth Championship in  Phnom Penh
 In the final,  defeated , 2–1. to win their 1st title.
  took third place and  took fourth place.

WAFF
 January 7 – 15: 2019 WAFF Women's Championship in  Muharraq
 Round Robin final positions: 1. , 2. , 3. , 4. , 5.

SAFF
 March 12 – 22: 2019 SAFF Women's Championship in 
 In the final,  defeated , 3–1, to win their 5th consecutive SAFF Women's Championship.
  and  shared semifinals.

UAFA
 May 5, 2018 – April 28: 2018–19 Arab Club Champions Cup
  Étoile du Sahel defeated  Al-Hilal FC, 2–1, to win their first Arab Club Champions Cup title.

CAF
National teams
 February 2 – 17: 2019 Africa U-20 Cup of Nations in  Niamey & Maradi
  defeated , 3–2 in penalties and after a 1–1 score in regular play, to win their first Africa U-20 Cup of Nations title.
  took third place.  took fourth place.
 Note: All teams mentioned above have qualified to compete at the 2019 FIFA U-20 World Cup.
 April 14 – 28: 2019 Africa U-17 Cup of Nations in  Dar es Salaam
  defeated , 5–3 in penalties and after a 0–0 score in regular play, to win their second Africa U-17 Cup of Nations title.
  took third place.  took fourth place.
 Note: All four teams mentioned above have qualified to compete at the 2019 FIFA U-17 World Cup.
 June 21 – July 19: 2019 Africa Cup of Nations in 
  defeated , 1–0, to win their second Africa Cup of Nations title.
  took third place.
 November 8 – 22: 2019 Africa U-23 Cup of Nations in  Cairo
 Champions: ; Second: ; Third: ; Fourth: ;

Clubs
 November 27, 2018 – May 26, 2019: 2018–19 CAF Confederation Cup
 Zamalek SC defeated  RS Berkane, 5–3 in penalties after a 1–1 score in regular play, to win their first CAF Confederation Cup title.
 November 27, 2018 – May 31: 2018–19 CAF Champions League
  Espérance de Tunis defeated  Wydad Casablanca, after the Moroccan team forfeited the second and final match between these teams. Therefore, Espérance de Tunis won their second consecutive and fourth overall CAF Champions League title.
 Note: Espérance de Tunis would represent the CAF at the 2019 FIFA Club World Cup.
 March 29: 2019 CAF Super Cup (March) in  Al Rayyan
  Raja Casablanca defeated  Espérance de Tunis, 2–1, to win their second CAF Super Cup title.

CONCACAF
National teams
 May 1 – 16: 2019 CONCACAF U-17 Championship in  Bradenton

Clubs
 February 19 – May 2: 2019 CONCACAF Champions League
  Monterrey defeated fellow Mexican team, UANL, 2–1 on aggregate, to win their fourth CONCACAF Champions League title.
 Note: Monterrey would represent CONCACAF at the 2019 FIFA Club World Cup.
 July 30 – November 26: 2019 CONCACAF League
  Saprissa defeated  Motagua, 1–0 on aggregate, to win their first CONCACAF League title.

OFC
National teams
 August 30 – September 12: 2019 OFC U-19 Women's Championship in  Matavera
  defeated , 5–2, to win their seventh consecutive OFC U-19 Women's Championship title.
  took third place.
 Note: New Zealand has qualified to compete at the 2020 FIFA U-20 Women's World Cup.
 September 21 – October 6: 2019 OFC Men's Olympic Qualifying Tournament (also named the 2019 OFC U-23 Championship) in 
  took third place.
 Note: New Zealand has qualified to compete at the 2020 Summer Olympics.

Clubs
 February 10 – May 12: 2019 OFC Champions League
  Hienghène Sport defeated fellow New Caledonian team, Magenta, 1–0, to win their first OFC Champions League title.
 Note: Hienghène Sport would represent CONCACAF at the 2019 FIFA Club World Cup.

Detailed beach soccer results

International beach soccer events
 March 9 – 17: 2019 AFC Beach Soccer Championship in  Pattaya
  defeated , 3–1 in penalties and after a 2–2 score in regular play, to win their third AFC Beach Soccer Championship title.
  took third place.
 Note: These three teams have qualified to compete at the 2019 FIFA Beach Soccer World Cup.
 April 28 – May 5: 2019 CONMEBOL Qualifier for the FIFA Beach Soccer World Cup in 
  defeated , 10–1, in the final. 
  took third place.
 Note 1: Both Brazil and Uruguay have qualified to compete at the 2019 FIFA Beach Soccer World Cup.
 Note 2: Paraguay has already qualified for the 2019 FIFA Beach Soccer World Cup as host nation.
 May 9 – 12: 2019 World Beach Games - European Qualifier in  Tarragona
 Men: 1. , 2. , 3. , 4. 
 Note 1: All men's teams mentioned above have qualified to compete at the 2019 World Beach Games.
 Women: 1. , 2. , 3. , 4. , 5. 
 Note 2: England and Spain (women's teams) have qualified to compete at the 2019 World Beach Games.
 May 13 – 19: 2019 CONCACAF Beach Soccer Championship in  Puerto Vallarta
  took third place.
 Note: Both Mexico and the United States qualify to compete at the 2019 FIFA Beach Soccer World Cup.
 June 17 – 22: 2019 OFC Beach Soccer Nations Cup in  Papeete
  took third place.
 Note: Tahiti has qualified to compete at the 2019 FIFA Beach Soccer World Cup.
 June 19 – 23: Part of the 2019 African Beach Games in  Sal (debut event)
  defeated , 4–1, to win the inaugural African Beach Games gold medal.
  took the bronze medal.
 June 25 – 29: Part of the 2019 European Games in  Minsk
  defeated , 8–3, to win their first European Games gold medal.
  won the bronze medal.
 July 19 – 27: 2019 UEFA Qualifier for the FIFA Beach Soccer World Cup in  Moscow
  defeated , 7–1, to book their team and compete at the 2019 FIFA Beach Soccer World Cup.
 August 3 – 5: 2019 World Beach Games - Americas Qualifier in  San Salvador
 Men: 1. , 2. , 3. , 4. 
 Note 1: Mexico and El Salvador have qualified to compete at the 2019 World Beach Games.
 Women: 1. , 2. , 3. , 4. 
 Note 2: Mexico (women's team) has qualified to compete at the 2019 World Beach Games.
 October 12 – 16: Part of the 2019 World Beach Games in  Doha
 Men:  ;  ;  
 Women:  ;  ;  
 November 21 – December 1: 2019 FIFA Beach Soccer World Cup in  Asunción
  defeated , 6–4, to win their third FIFA Beach Soccer World Cup title.
  took third place.

2019 Euro Beach Soccer League
 July 5 – 7: EBSL #1 in  Nazaré
 Division A – Group 1: 1. , 2. , 3. , 4. 
 Division A – Group 2: 1. , 2. , 3. , 4. 
 Division B: 1. , 2. , 3. , 4. 
 August 16 – 18: EBSL #2 in  Catania
 Division A: 1. , 2. , 3. , 4. 
 Division B – Main: 1. , 2. , 3. , 4. 
 Division B – Group 1: 1. , 2. , 3. , 4. 
 Division B – Group 2: 1. , 2. , 3. , 4. 
 September 5 – 8: Euro Beach Soccer League Superfinal & Promotion Final in  Figueira da Foz
 Superfinal:  defeated , 4–2, to win their sixth Euro Beach Soccer League title.
  took third place.
 Promotional Final:  defeated , 2–1, to win their second Euro Beach Soccer League Promotional title.
  took third place.

BSWW
 February 27 – March 3: 2019 Mundialito de Clubes in  Moscow
  S.C. Braga defeated  Domusbet Catania BS, 7–6, in the final.
  CR Flamengo took third place.
 March 20 – 23: 2019 South American Beach Games in  Rosario
  defeated , 8–1, to win the gold medal in this event.
  defeated , 6–5, to win the bronze medal in this event.
 April 16 – 21: 2019 InterCup in  Saint Petersburg
  defeated  BSC Kristall, 7–6, in the final.
  took third place.
 April 26 – 28: 2019 CFA Belt and Road International Beach Soccer Cup in  Haikou
 Champions: ; Second: ; Third: ; Fourth: 
 May 30 – June 5: 2019 Euro Winners Challenge in  Nazaré
 Group A winners:  CF Chelas
 Group B winners:  G.D. Sesimbra
 Group C winners:  BSC CSKA Moscow
 Group D winners:  BSC Lokomotiv Moscow
 Group E winners:  Grupo Desportivo de Alfarim
 Group F winners:  AO Kefallinia
 June 1 – 9: 2019 Euro Winners Cup in  Nazaré
  Braga defeated  KP Łódź, 6–0, to win their third consecutive Euro Winners Cup title.
  Levante UD took third place.
 June 2 – 9: 2019 Women's Euro Winners Cup in  Nazaré
  AIS Playas de San Javier defeated fellow Spanish team, Madrid CFF, 2–0 in penalties and after a 3–3 score in regular play, to win their first Women's Euro Winners Cup title.
  Stade de Reims took third place.
 June 7 – 9: NASSC – US Open 2019 in  Virginia Beach
 For detailed results, click here .
 July 5 – 7: 2019 Women's Euro Beach Soccer Cup in  Nazaré
  defeated , 3–2, to win their second consecutive Women's Euro Beach Soccer Cup title.
  took third place.
 July 12 – 14: 2019 BSWW Tour #1 - Talent Beach Soccer Cup in  Budapest
 Champions: ; Second: ; Third: ; Fourth: 
 July 12 – 14: 2019 BSWW Tour #2 – Morocco Beach Soccer Cup in  Agadir
 Champions: ; Second: ; Third: ; Fourth: 
 July 12 – 14: 2019 Clubs Challenger Cup in  São Sebastião (debut event)
 Champions:  Cerro Porteño; Second:  Flamengo; Third:  Club Libertad; Fourth:  Rosario Central
 July 17 – 20: 2019 Neom Beach Soccer Cup in 
  defeated , 5–4 at extra time, to win their first Neom Beach Soccer Cup title.
  took third place.
 August 13 – 15: 2019 BSWW Mundialito Nazaré in 
 Champions: ; Second: ; Third: ; Fourth: 
 September 7 – 11: BSWW Tour #3 – Goalfun CFA China-Latin America Beach Soccer Championship in  Tangshan
 Champions: ; Second: ; Third: 
 October 21 – 27: 2019 World Winners Cup in  Alanya
 Men:  CR Flamengo defeated  Meizhou Hakka, 5–3, in the final.
 Women:  Pavia Lokrians defeated  Lady Grembach EE Łódź, 3–0, in the final.
 November 1 – 3: BSWW Tour #4 – Copa Lagos in 
 Champions: ; Second: ; Third: ; Fourth: 
 November 5 – 9: 2019 Intercontinental Beach Soccer Cup in  Dubai
  defeated , 6–3, in the final. The  took third place.

Detailed futsal results

UEFA (futsal)
 February 14 – 17: UEFA Women's Futsal Euro 2019 Finals in  Gondomar (debut event)
  defeated , 4–0, to win the inaugural UEFA Women's Futsal Euro title.
  took third place.
 April 26 – 28: 2018–19 UEFA Futsal Champions League Finals in  Almaty
  Sporting CP defeated  AFC Kairat, 2–1, to win their first UEFA Futsal Champions League title.
  Barcelona took third place.
 July 15 – 23: European Universities Futsal Championship 2019 in  Braga
 Men:  University of Málaga defeated  National University of Kharkiv, 5–1, to win their 4th Men's European Universities Futsal Championship.
  University of Minho took third place.
 Women:  University of Murcia defeated  University of Münster, 3–1, to win their first Women's European Universities Futsal Championship.
  National Pedagogical Dragomanov University took third place.
 September 8 – 14: 2019 UEFA Under-19 Futsal Championship in  Riga (debut event)
  defeated , 6–1, to win the inaugural UEFA Under-19 Futsal Championship title.

CONMEBOL (futsal)
National teams
 October 21 – 30: 2019 Copa América de Futsal in  Santiago
 Tournament suspended due to 2019 Chilean protests.
 December 13 – 20: 2019 Copa América Femenina de Futsal in  Luque
  defeated , 4–1, to win their second in a row and a record sixth overall Copa América de Futsal title.
  took third place.

Clubs
 July 14 – 21: 2019 Copa Libertadores de Futsal in  Buenos Aires
  Carlos Barbosa defeated  Cerro Porteño, 3–1, to win their third consecutive and seventh overall Copa Libertadores de Futsal title.
  Alianza Platanera took third place.
 December 1 – 8: 2019 Copa Libertadores Femenina de Futsal in  Camboriú
  Cianorte defeated  Independiente Cali, 2–0, to win their first Copa Libertadores Femenina de Futsal title.
  Kimberley took third place.

AFC (futsal)
 June 14 – 22: 2019 AFC U-20 Futsal Championship in  Tabriz
  defeated , 3–1, to win their first AFC U-20 Futsal Championship title.
  took third place.
 June 18 – 23: 2019 AFF Futsal Club Championship in  Nakhon Ratchasima
  Chonburi Bluewave Futsal Club defeated  Sanvinest Sanatech Khanh Hoa, 9–1, to win their first AFF Futsal Club Championship title.
  Myanmar Imperial University took third place.
 August 7 – 17: 2019 AFC Futsal Club Championship in  Bangkok
  Nagoya Oceans defeated  Mes Sungun FSC, 2–0, to win their fourth AFC Futsal Club Championship title.
  Thái Sơn Nam took third place.
 October 21 – 27: 2019 AFF Futsal Championship in  Ho Chi Minh City
  defeated , 5–0, to win their eighth consecutive and 15th overall AFF Futsal Championship title.
  took third place.

OFC (futsal)
 October 27 – November 2: 2019 OFC Futsal Nations Cup in  Noumea
 The  defeated , 2–1 in penalties and after a 5–5 score in regular play, to win their second consecutive and sixth overall OFC Futsal Nations Cup title.
  took third place.
 Note: The Solomon Islands has qualified to compete at the 2020 FIFA Futsal World Cup.

Deaths

January

January 1 
Ivan Dimitrov, Bulgarian footballer (born 1935)
Freddie Glidden, Scottish footballer (born 1927)
January 21 – Emiliano Sala, Argentine footballer (born 1990)
January 24 – Hugh McIlvanney, Scottish football journalist (born 1934)

February

February 3 – Stephen Negoesco, Romanian-American soccer player and coach (born 1925)
February 5 – Joe Fascione, Scottish former footballer and manager (born 1945)
February 8 – Fernando Clavijo, Uruguayan-American soccer player and coach (born 1956) 
February 9 
Katharina Lindner, German footballer (born 1979)
Ian Ross, Scottish former footballer and manager (born 1947)
February 12 – Gordon Banks, English goalkeeper (born 1937)
February 17 – Johnny Valentine, Scottish footballer (born 1930)

March

March 4 – Eric Caldow, Scottish former football and manager (born 1934)
March 25 – Barrie Hole, Welsh footballer (born 1942)

April

April 12 – Ivor Broadis, English former footballer and manager (born 1922)
April 22 – Billy McNeill, Scottish former footballer and manager (born 1940)
April 26 – Jimmy Banks, American soccer player (born 1964)
April 29
Stevie Chalmers, Scottish footballer (born 1935)
Josef Šural, Czech footballer (born 1990)

May

May 13 – George Smith, Scottish football referee (born 1943)
May 16 – David Cervinski, Australian soccer player (born 1970)
May 26 – Harry Hood, Scottish former footballer and manager (born 1944)

June

June 1 – José Antonio Reyes, Spanish footballer (born 1983)
June 4 
George Darwin, English footballer (born 1932)
Lawrie Leslie, Scottish footballer (born 1935)
June 6 – Johnny Robinson, English footballer (born 1936)
June 8 – Justin Edinburgh, English former footballer and manager (born 1969)
June 13: Geoff Lees, English footballer (born 1933)
June 17: Ian MacFarlane, English former footballer and manager (born 1933)
June 19: Dennis White, English footballer (born 1948)

July
 
July 1 – Renato Dehò, 72, Italian footballer.

August
 
August 2 – Gildo Cunha do Nascimento, 79, Brazilian footballer (Palmeiras, Flamengo, Paranaense).

September
 
September 2 – Gyoji Matsumoto, 85, Japanese footballer (national team), heart disease.

October
 
October 1 – Fred Molyneux, 75, English footballer (Southport, Plymouth Argyle, Tranmere Rovers).

November
 
November 1 – Diana González, 26, Mexican footballer (América), hypoglycemia.

December
 
December 2 – Francesco Janich, 82, Italian footballer (Lazio, Bologna, national team).

References

External links 

 
Association football by year